Eva Karlsson (born 21 September 1961) is a Swedish sprint canoer who competed in the 1980s. She won a silver medal in the K-4 500 m event at the 1984 Summer Olympics, together with teammates Susanne Wiberg-Gunnarsson, Anna Olsson and Agneta Andersson.

Karlsson's husband Thomas Ohlsson won a silver medal in the K-4 1000 m event at those same games.

She also won a bronze medal in the K-4 500 m event at the 1981 ICF Canoe Sprint World Championships in Nottingham.

References
DatabaseOlympics.com profile

1961 births
Canoeists at the 1984 Summer Olympics
Living people
Olympic canoeists of Sweden
Olympic silver medalists for Sweden
Swedish female canoeists
Olympic medalists in canoeing
ICF Canoe Sprint World Championships medalists in kayak

Medalists at the 1984 Summer Olympics